Giovanni Moretti is the name of:

 Giovanni Moretti (composer)  (1807–1884), Italian composer, music pedagogue, and conductor
 Giovanni Moretti (footballer) (1909–1971), Italian footballer
 Giovanni Moretti (bishop) (1923–2018), Italian prelate of the Roman Catholic Church